P'adla I (died 893), of the Arevmaneli clan, was a Prince and chorepiscopus of Kakheti in eastern Georgia from 881 to 893. He attained to his office after suppressing the Donauri family, which had ruled Kakheti from 839 to 881. During his rule, Padla succeeded in recovering the district of Gardabani conquered by the Arab emir of Tiflis from his predecessor Gabriel.

Bibliography 
Toumanoff, Cyrille (1976, Rome). Manuel de Généalogie et de Chronologie pour le Caucase chrétien (Arménie, Géorgie, Albanie).
Вахушти Багратиони. 

893 deaths
Princes of Kakheti
Year of birth unknown